Ferula drudeana is a species of flowering plant in the family Apiaceae, native to the Adana area of Turkey. It has been proposed as a candidate for the fabled silphium plant of antiquity. It is known from only three locations in Turkey, all sites of longstanding villages. DNA evidence shows that it is in a clade with Central Asian species of Ferula. 

It was first sampled by Walter E. Siehe (a German engineer and sampler) in July 1909, in the northern Adana Province and identified as Ferula ovina. Siehe sent samples to Komarov Botanical Institute in St. Petersburg and to Royal Botanic Garden in Edinburgh. In 1930, while studying the samples at the Leningrad herbarium, Evgenii Korovin identified the plant as a new species, calling it Ferula drudeana. In 1983 Mahmut Miski started researching the plant in the wild of Mount Hasan, and in 2021 he published a paper in Plants, comparing Ferula drudeana to silphium and proposing it as potential silphium species.

Ferula drudeana is a tall perennial herb, with thick, branching roots, compared to ginseng; a grooved stalk and stout striated stems; frond-like basal leaves and pinnate celery-like leaves with a stout basal sheath clasping the stem; yellow flowers produced in large umbels; and papery mericarps, shaped like inverted hearts. The plant takes at least ten years to mature and requires cold stratification to germinate, which makes it very hard to cultivate and propagate.

References

drudeana
Endemic flora of Turkey
Plants described in 1947